Ludwig Mayer (1879 Prenzlau - 1978 Jerusalem) was an Israeli merchant who opened the first modern book store in Palestine.

Mayer was born in Germany to a family of Jewish wool merchants. After apprenticing as a bookseller, he moved to Ottoman Palestine in 1908 to open a book store in Jerusalem. Meyer's clientele included Eliezer Ben-Yehuda and David Ben Gurion. 

Mayer died in Jerusalem in 1978.

References 

 The Jerusalem Report: "Pioneer Bookseller" 14 Nov. 2012: http://www.jpost.com/Features/InThespotlight/Article.aspx?id=291752
 The Jerusalem Post, "Appreciation: Herman Mayer, bookstore owner, hosted founding fathers" 8 June 2008: http://www.jpost.com/Features/Article.aspx?id=110243
The Jerusalem Post, "Mayer's Bookstore: It's the Real Thing" 1 Nov. 2011: http://www.jpost.com/LocalIsrael/InJerusalem/Article.aspx?id=9886
 Encounter, Congress for Cultural Freedom, Stephen Spender, Irving Kristol, Congress for Cultural Freedom, Encounter Limited, 1978,  vol. 51, p. 143
Publishers weekly, vol. 124, 1933 Browker Co. p.ix / 1692
ISRAEL Magazine, 1968: vol. 1, no 8-12, spotlight publications, pp. 85
Stimmen aus Jerusalem, Zur deutschen Sprache und Literatur in Palaestina/Israel (hrg Herman Zabel) Deutsch-Israelische Bibliothek, Bd. 2 (LIT Verlag, Berlin 2006)

1879 births
1978 deaths
Booksellers (people)
Emigrants from the German Empire to the Ottoman Empire